Mad Hour is a 1928 American silent drama film directed by Joseph Boyle and starring Sally O'Neil, Alice White and Donald Reed. It was adapted from a 1914 novel by Elinor Glyn.

Cast
 Sally O'Neil as Cuddles  
 Alice White as Aimee  
 Donald Reed as Jack Hemingway Jr  
 Larry Kent as Elmer Grubb  
 Lowell Sherman as Joe Mack 
 Norman Trevor as Hemingway Sr  
 Eddie Clayton as Red  
 Jim Farley as Inspector  
 Rose Dione as Modiste  
 Tully Marshall as Lawyer 
 Margaret Livingston as Maid  
 Jack Egan as Chauffeur  
 Kate Price as Jail Matron  
 Mary Foy as Police Matron  
 Ione Holmes as Bride

Preservation status
This film is of late a lost film.

See also
The Man and the Moment (1918)
The Man and the Moment (1929)

References

Bibliography
 Goble, Alan. The Complete Index to Literary Sources in Film. Walter de Gruyter, 1999.

External links

1928 films
1928 drama films
Silent American drama films
American silent feature films
1920s English-language films
American black-and-white films
Films about weddings
Films based on British novels
First National Pictures films
Films directed by Joseph Boyle
1920s American films